The title Queen of the Gypsies may refer to the following women:

Carmen Amaya (1918–1963), flamenco dancer
Esma Redžepova (1943–2016), singer and activist
Matilda Stanley (1821?—1878)

It also may refer to:
Title of Queen Mab in the opera La jolie fille de Perth
Gypsies Are Found Near Heaven, 1975 film
"Queen of the Gypsies", 1975 Kojak episode